The Tivoli Bar and Grill is the oldest bar in San Diego, California, located at 505 Sixth Ave. in the Gaslamp Quarter. It opened as a saloon in 1885.

Between 1872 and 1885, the building housed a boarding house, a feed store, and a blacksmith shop, and the nine apartments above the bar were once used as a brothel.

The bar retains its original wooden bar and back bar, and the first cash register to be installed is still on display. Wyatt Earp was once a regular at the bar.

References

External links

 

1885 establishments in California
Buildings and structures in San Diego
Gaslamp Quarter, San Diego